Zaib Shaikh (born May 25, 1974) is a Canadian actor, writer, and director. He was named Canada's Consul General in Los Angeles, California in October 2018.

Career
Shaikh has appeared in Metropia and Little Mosque on the Prairie, and as Vancouver city councillor Shakil Khan in Da Vinci's City Hall. He is co-founder of the Whistler Theatre Project, and also writer and director of the CBC adaptation of Othello. He appeared as Nadir Khan in Deepa Mehta's film adaptation of Midnight's Children. He guest starred as Professor Mahmoud Bahmanyaron in an episode of Murdoch Mysteries which aired March 18, 2013.

Personal life
Shaikh was born in Toronto, Ontario, and is of Pakistani descent. He studied theatre at the Mississauga campus of the University of Toronto and has a Bachelor of Arts from Sheridan College. While at UTM, Shaikh was a copy editor for the campus newspaper, The Medium. He has a Master of Fine Arts degree from the University of Toronto.

Since 2011, Shaikh has been married to Kirstine Stewart, former managing director of Twitter Canada.

On May 29, 2014, Shaikh was named the film commissioner and director of entertainment industries for the City of Toronto.

References

External links

1974 births
Living people
Canadian male film actors
Canadian male television actors
Male actors from Toronto
Sheridan College alumni
University of British Columbia alumni
Canadian male actors of Pakistani descent
Canadian diplomats
Canadian civil servants
University of Toronto alumni
Canadian television directors
Consuls